Kylmäkoski (literally meaning "cold rapids") is a former municipality of Finland. It was consolidated with the town of Akaa on 1 January 2011. It was located in the Pirkanmaa region. At the end of 2011, the urban area of Kylmäkoski had 674 inhabitants. The municipality was unilingually Finnish.

The coat of arms of Kylmäkoski was designed by Kaj Kajander and confirmed in 1965. In the 1980s, oven-baked pikeperch and horseradish sauce were named Kylmäkoski's traditional parish dishes.

The Kylmäkoski Prison (Kylmäkosken vankila) is located in the Tipuri's industrial area.

See also
 Toijala
 Viiala

References

External links

Municipality of Kylmäkoski – Official website

Akaa
Former municipalities of Finland
Populated places established in 1895
Populated places disestablished in 2011
1895 establishments in the Russian Empire